Love Yes is the third studio album by American band Teen. It was released in February 2016 under Carpark Records.

Track listing

References

2016 albums
Carpark Records albums
Teen (band) albums